Demetrius Joyette (born March 14, 1993) is a Canadian actor best known for portraying the role of Michael Theodore Davies in the sitcom The Latest Buzz, Porter Jackson on Wingin' It and Mike Dallas in Degrassi. Joyette was born in Toronto and now resides in Los Angeles.

Filmography

Film

Television

Awards and nominations

References

External links 

 

1993 births
Living people
21st-century Canadian male actors
Black Canadian male actors
Canadian male child actors
Canadian male film actors
Canadian male television actors
Canadian male voice actors
Canadian people of Saint Vincent and the Grenadines descent
Male actors from Toronto